Shyamal Santra is an Indian politician. He was elected to the West Bengal Legislative Assembly from Katulpur in 2014 and 2016.

References

West Bengal MLAs 2011–2016
Trinamool Congress politicians from West Bengal
Living people
Year of birth missing (living people)
West Bengal MLAs 2016–2021
People from Bankura district